Waddell is a surname.  Notable people with the name include:

 Alan Waddell (1914–2008), Australian walker
 Alexander Waddell FRSE (1789–1827), Scottish astronomer and meteorologist
 Alfred Moore Waddell (1834–1912), American politician
 Angus Waddell (born 1964), Australian swimmer
 Barry Waddell (born 1936), Australian cyclist 
 Brandon Waddell (born 1994), American baseball player
 Cheryl Boyd Waddell (?–2002), American opera singer
 Chris Waddell, American Paralympic alpine skier
 Cosslett Herbert Waddell (1858–1918), Irish clergyman and botanist
 Craig Waddell (born 1995), Scottish curler
 Don Waddell (born 1958), American hockey player & executive
 Ernest Waddell (born 1986), American actor
 Gordon Waddell (1937–2012), Scottish rugby union player and South African politician
 Helen Waddell (1889 – 1965), Irish poet, translator and playwright
 Herbert Waddell (1902–1988), Scottish rugby union footballer
 Hope Masterton Waddell, missionary
 Hugh Waddell (disambiguation)
 Ian Waddell (1942–2021), Canadian politician
 Ian Waddell (footballer), Scottish footballer
 James Waddell (disambiguation), multiple people
 Jason Waddell (born 1981), American baseball player
 Jimmy Waddell, Scottish curler, European champion
 John Waddell (disambiguation), multiple people
 Justine Waddell (born 1976), South African actress
 Kyle Waddell (born 1993), Scottish curler
 Laurence Waddell (1854–1938), British explorer and author
 Leila Waddell (1880–1932), American writer, magician, and musician 
 Martin Waddell, Irish children's author
 Moses Waddel (1770–1840), American educator
 Peter Hately Waddell (1817–1891), Scottish cleric
 R. Bruce Waddell (1914–1979), American businessman and politician
 Ricky L. Waddell, major general, US Army Reserve
 Rob Waddell (born 1975), New Zealand rower, yachtsman, and rugby player
 Rube Waddell (1876–1914), American baseball player
 Sid Waddell (1940–2012), British commentator and television personality
 Sonia Waddell (born 1973), New Zealand rower
 Terrie Waddell, Australian actress
 Thomas Waddell (1854–1940), Australian politician
 Tom Waddell (baseball) (1958–2019), Scottish baseball player
 William Waddell (disambiguation), multiple people
 Winifred Waddell (1884–1972), English-born Australian botanist
 Zane Waddell (born 1998), South African swimmer